Yngve Nordwall (13 April 1908 – 23 January 1994) was a Swedish film actor and director.

Filmography

References

External links

1908 births
1994 deaths
People from Uppsala
Swedish male film actors
Swedish film directors
20th-century Swedish male actors